Scene It? Lights, Camera, Action is a video game adaptation of popular DVD-based party game of the same name exclusively for the Xbox 360. The game features over 1,800 questions. Downloadable content through Xbox Live was planned for the game for early 2008, but it never materialized, most likely due to the release of the sequel, Scene It? Box Office Smash. The game was introduced at E3 2007 by Microsoft and released on November 6, 2007. The game includes footage from many movies including Kramer vs. Kramer, Caveman, and Charlie's Angels.

Gameplay

Scene It? Lights, Camera, Action is identical in gameplay to the original DVD version, but features over 20 new types of puzzle challenges, including:

Credit Roll: the player guesses the film based on a list of characters and actors.
Quotables: the player must finish a line from a famous film.
Child's Play: the player guesses the name of a movie based on a kid's drawing of a scene from the film.

Big Button Pad

The game can be played with an Xbox 360 controller, but comes bundled with four special wireless controllers called Big Button Pads which resemble game show buzzers. Each controller has one large "buzzer" button at the top, the A, B, X, and Y buttons arranged vertically, and an Xbox Guide button.

The controllers use infrared rather than Microsoft's proprietary wireless standard, and whilst the Xbox 360 has an infrared receiver, it is not designed to interface with four devices simultaneously; therefore a sensor add-on is included and must be plugged into the 360 for the controllers to be usable.

Other games such as Uno and Wits and Wagers have added support for the Big Button Pads.

Reception

Scene It? Lights, Camera, Action received mixed to positive reviews from critics upon release. On Metacritic, the game holds a score of 73/100 based on 41 reviews, indicating "mixed or average reviews". On GameRankings, the game holds a score of 73.56% based on 44 reviews.

Awards
Scene It? Lights, Camera, Action was an Academy of Interactive Arts & Sciences nominee for 2007 Family Game of the Year.

Sequel
A sequel, Scene It? Box Office Smash was released on October 28, 2008.

References

External links
The Whole Experience, developers of Scene It? Lights, Camera, Action

2007 video games
Microsoft games
Digital tabletop games
Party video games
Quiz video games
Xbox 360-only games
Xbox 360 games
Video games based on Mattel toys
Video games developed in the United States
Lights, Camera, Action
Multiplayer and single-player video games
Video games using Havok